Dina Nath Walli  (1908–2006), also known by his pen name Almast Kashmiri, was a water colour artist and poet from Srinagar city in Kashmir valley. He was the part of the modern art movement in the state of Jammu and Kashmir and was known for painting everyday scenes of Kashmir.

Early life and education

His father died when Dina Nath was very young. He had his early education in Srinagar, then he continued his three years course at Amar Singh Technical Institute, Srinagar and then he moved to Calcutta in 1930 to learn art by giving group shows, he learned various forms of art under the guidance of Percy Brown, principal of the Government College of Art & Craft at the University of Calcutta.

Career
In 1936, he returned to Srinagar, where he concentrated on landscape painting in water colours. He was also awarded gold medals by the government of Kashmir in 1939 and in 1940 he was awarded a highly commended medal from the Academy of Fine Arts, Calcutta. He had also produced an album of 12 paintings.

Under his pen name of Almast Kashmiri, his  "accent on realistic art or people's poetry", is best seen in his two collections of his poetry, Bala Yapair (This side of Mountains, 1955) and Sahaavukh Posh (Desert Flowers, 1981).

Works

 Kashmir Water Colour Paintings, by Dinanath Walli. Walli, 1970.
 Sahraavuky posh: desert flowers, by Dinanath Walli. Metropolitan Book Co., 1978.

References

External links
 
 Paintings - Walli, KOA USA
 Shehjar.com

Indian male painters
1908 births
2006 deaths
People from Srinagar
Kashmiri people
Indian watercolourists
Kashmiri poets
Government College of Art & Craft alumni
University of Calcutta alumni
Impressionist painters
20th-century Indian poets
20th-century Indian painters
Indian male poets
Poets from Jammu and Kashmir
20th-century Indian male writers
Painters from Jammu and Kashmir
20th-century pseudonymous writers
20th-century Indian male artists